Suspending Disbelief is the eighth album by American singer-songwriter Jimmy Webb, released in September 1993 by Elektra Records.

Production
Suspending Disbelief was recorded in February and March 1993 at The Site and Skywalker Ranch in Marin County, California, Russian Hill Recording in San Francisco, and Johnny Yuma Recording in Los Angeles. The album was mixed at Record One in Los Angeles.

Critical reception
In his review for AllMusic, William Ruhlmann wrote that Suspending Belief contains Webb's "most straightforward, plainspoken writing yet" and that the songwriter "seems better able to perform his music now than at any time in the past." Ruhlmann continued:

The AllMusic website gave the album four out of five stars. Glen Campbell would record four tracks on this album for his final album, Adios.

Track listing

Personnel

Music
 Jimmy Webb – vocals, piano, electric piano, synthesizer, arranger, conductor
 Linda Ronstadt – vocals, backing vocals
 Skywalker Symphony Orchestra – orchestra
 Steve Lukather – electric guitar
 Dean Parks – guitar
 Ben Keith – steel guitar
 Mario Guarneri – piccolo trumpet, trumpet
 Leland Sklar – bass
 Russ Kunkel – drums, percussion
 Valerie Carter – backing vocals
 David Crosby – backing vocals
 Leah Kunkel – backing vocals
 Craig Fuller – backing vocals
 J.D. Souther – backing vocals
 Don Henley – backing vocals

Production
 Linda Ronstadt – producer
 George Massenburg – producer, engineer, mixing 
 Bob Conlon – engineer
 David Gleeson – engineer
 Chris Haynes – engineer
 Nathaniel Kunkel – engineer
 Rail Jon Rogut – engineer
 Kevin Scott – engineer
 Craig Silvey – engineer
 Squeak Stone – engineer
 Bob Fisher – mastering
 Greg Sudmeir – coordination
 Ivy Skoff – production coordination
 Kosh Art – direction, design
 Richie Unterberger – liner notes
 Robbie Buchanan – programming, synthesizer programming
 Robert Blakeman – photography

References

1993 albums
Albums produced by George Massenburg
Elektra Records albums
Jimmy Webb albums